Sahiwal railway station (Urdu and ) is located in Sahiwal city, Sahiwal district of Punjab province of the Pakistan.

History
In 2016, the old building of the station was demolished and a budget of Rs221 million was spent to reconstruct the modern building.

See also
 List of railway stations in Pakistan
 Pakistan Railways

References

Railway stations in Sahiwal District
Railway stations on Karachi–Peshawar Line (ML 1)